Antonio Hernández (born 1953 in Peñaranda de Bracamonte, Salamanca) is a Spanish film director and screenwriter.

In 1994, he created the TV company Zeppelín Televisión.

Filmography

Film

See also
Cinema of Spain

References

External links 
 

1953 births
Living people
People from the Province of Salamanca
Film directors from Castile and León
Spanish male screenwriters